Ledce is a municipality and village in Hradec Králové District in the Hradec Králové Region of the Czech Republic. It has about 300 inhabitants.

Administrative parts
Villages of Klášter nad Dědinou and Újezdec are administrative parts of Ledce.

References

External links

Villages in Hradec Králové District